Cambridge House Community College is a British international school in Valencia, Spain.

The school is now owned by Globe Educate. They are improving the school and are creating more opportunities for students by adding many unique extra-curriculum activities such as MUN (Model United Nations).

History
Tracy Ibberson established the school in 1986. The school initially had 10 students.

The school has been sold to the community of Globe Educate, a group of schools that unite many schools from different countries.

Student body
As of 2010 the school had 1,200 students, most of whom came from Spanish families. 150 students came from British families. Cambridge House mainly caters to Spanish families.

See also
 Instituto Español Vicente Cañada Blanch - Spanish international school in London
 British immigration in Spain

References

External links
 

Schools in Valencia
British international schools in Spain
1986 establishments in Spain
Educational institutions established in 1986